Irving "Al" Gross (February 22, 1918 – December 21, 2000) was a pioneer in mobile wireless communication. He created and patented many communications devices, specifically in relation to an early version of the walkie-talkie, Citizens' Band radio, the telephone pager and the cordless telephone.

Biography

Gross was born in Toronto, Ontario, Canada in 1918, the son of Romanian-Jewish immigrants, he grew up in Cleveland, Ohio, in the United States.

His lifelong enthusiasm for radio was sparked at age nine, when traveling on Lake Erie by a steamboat. While sneaking around the boat he ended up in the radio transmissions room. The ship's operator let him listen in on transmissions. Later, Gross turned the basement of his house into a radio station, built from scavenged junkyard parts.

At sixteen he earned his amateur radio license, and he used his call sign (W8PAL) his whole life.

The walkie-talkie
His interest and knowledge in radio technology had grown considerably by the time he in 1936 entered the BSEE program at Cleveland's Case of Applied Sciences (now a part of Case Western Reserve University).
He was determined to investigate the unexplored frequency region above 100 MHz. Between 1938 and 1941, soon after the invention of the walkie talkie in 1937 by Donald Hings, he created and patented his own version of the "walkie-talkie".

World War II
During World War II, Gross had some limited involvement in building a two-way air-to-ground communications system for the U.S. OSS (a forerunner to the CIA) for use in military operations, known as the Joan-Eleanor system. It comprised a hand-held SSTC-502 transceiver ("Joan") and a much larger aircraft-based SSTR-6 transceiver ("Eleanor"). Gross' actual contribution to the project is unclear (he was not an OSS member), but the main developers on the project were Dewitt R. Goddard and Lt. Cmdr. Stephen H. Simpson (Goddard's wife's name was Eleanor, and reportedly Joan was an acquaintance of Simpson). The system operated at frequencies above 250 MHz, which was at a much higher frequency than the enemy had thought conceivable. This allowed operatives using "Joan" to communicate with high altitude bombers carrying "Eleanor" for times of 10 to 15 minutes without the use of code words, eliminating the need for decryption. It was developed beginning in late 1942, was highly successful and very difficult to detect behind enemy lines at the time. It was marked Top Secret by the U.S. military until it was declassified and made public in 1976.

Citizens' Band (CB)
After the war the FCC allocated the first frequencies for personal radio services; the Citizens' Radio Service Frequency Band (1946). Gross formed Gross Electronics Co. to produce two-way communications system to utilize these frequencies, and his
company was the first to receive FCC approval in 1948. He sold more than 100 thousand units of his system, mostly to farmers and the U.S. Coast Guard.

Two-way radios

Cartoonist Chester Gould asked if he could use Gross' concept of a miniaturized two-way radio in his Dick Tracy comic strip. The result was the Dick Tracy two-way wrist radio.

Telephone pager
Another breakthrough came in 1949 when he adapted his two-way radios to one-way for cordless remote telephonic signaling. He had effectively invented the first telephone pager system. His intention for this system was to be used by medical doctors, but was met with skepticism by doctors who were afraid the system would upset patients. This same technology is used in one-way radio signaling devices such as garage door openers.

Later years
In 1950 he tried in vain to interest telephone companies in mobile telephony. Bell Telephone was uninterested, and other companies were afraid of Bell's monopoly on transmission lines.

Gross continued inventing, and began working as a specialist in microwave and other communications systems for companies such as Sperry Corporation and General Electric. He continued working until his death at age 82.

Recognition
Gross has received much recognition for his work, including, but not limited to:

Awards
 1992: Fred M. Link Award from the Radio Club of America
 1984: IEEE Centennial Medal from the Institute of Electrical and Electronics Engineers, for his work in VHF and UHF mobile radio.
 1997: Marconi Memorial Gold Medal of Achievement from the Veteran Wireless Operators Association
 1998: Eta Kappa Nu's Vladimir Karapetoff Eminent Members' Award
 1999: Edwin Howard Armstrong Achievement Award from the IEEE Communications Society
 2000: IEEE Millennium Medal

Honors
 2000: Lemelson-MIT Lifetime Achievement Award for Invention and Innovation

See also 
 Wireless communication
 Radio

References

External links 
 In Memoriam, from IEEE (requires login)
 Al Gross Papers, Ms2001-011, at the Virginia Tech Special Collections and University Archives
 Digital images from the Al Gross Papers, Ms2001-011, and exhibits from Virginia Tech Special Collections and University Archives
 Inventor of the Week — Article on Al Gross from MIT
 Al Gross - father of Walkie Talkies — Short article on Al Gross from a PMR446 website.
 Interview with Al Gross from 1999
 About.com article on walkie-talkie
 Al Gross recorded interviews and extensive biography
 Al Gross Obituary — Audio interview
 Hamgallery.com tribute
 Al Gross — Prominent Member of EMC Society
 ARLX014 Personal Communications Pioneer Al Gross, W8PAL, SK
 Patents filed to Irving A. Gross from Google patents
 articles about Al Gross

1918 births
2000 deaths
20th-century American inventors
Canadian inventors
Case Western Reserve University alumni
Amateur radio people
Lemelson–MIT Prize
Canadian people of Romanian-Jewish descent
Canadian emigrants to the United States
People from Cleveland
People from Toronto
IEEE Centennial Medal laureates
American people of Romanian-Jewish descent
Canadian Jews
Dick Tracy